Urzhil is a rural locality (an ulus) in Barguzinsky District, Republic of Buryatia, Russia. The population was 211 as of 2010. There are 3 streets.

References 

Rural localities in Barguzinsky District